Ralf Reichenbach (31 July 1950 – 12 February 1998) was a German shot putter. He represented West Germany and competed for the club OSC Berlin and LG Süd Berlin during his active career. He competed in the men's shot put at the 1972 Summer Olympics and the 1976 Summer Olympics.

Achievements

References

1950 births
1998 deaths
West German male shot putters
Athletes (track and field) at the 1972 Summer Olympics
Athletes (track and field) at the 1976 Summer Olympics
Olympic athletes of West Germany
European Athletics Championships medalists
Sportspeople from Wiesbaden